New Liberty is an unincorporated community in northern Owen County, Kentucky, United States. Kentucky Routes 36 and 227 run through the community. Despite being unincorporated, it has a post office with a ZIP Code of 40355.

The Jacob Hunter House is listed on the National Register of Historic Places. Much of the downtown area is also listed as the New Liberty Historic District. 

New Liberty was platted in 1815. A former variant name was "Twin Meeting House", after a church located in the community. A post office called New Liberty has been in operation since 1823.

References

External links
 Northern Kentucky Views: A Broad Collection of Images and Texts On the History of Northern Kentucky

Unincorporated communities in Kentucky
Unincorporated communities in Owen County, Kentucky